The AgustaWestland AW109S Grand is a lightweight, twin-engine, eight-seat multi-purpose helicopter built by the Anglo-Italian manufacturer AgustaWestland. This rotorcraft has been developed from AgustaWestland AW109 by lengthening the cabin and main rotor blades with different tip design. The Agusta Grand is fitted with two Pratt & Whitney Canada PW207C engines whereas its predecessor AW109E has two Pratt & Whitney Canada PW206C engines. It originally entered service in 2005 and has since been used in various roles, including light transport, medevac, search-and-rescue, and military roles.

Variants
A109S Grand Marketed as the AW109 Grand, has a lengthened cabin-upgraded civilian version with two Pratt & Whitney Canada PW207C engines and lengthened main rotor blades with different tip design from the previous AW109E version.
AW109SP GrandNewSingle pilot IFR, TAWS and EVS, with new avionics and front section of the fuselage made from carbon fiber to reduce weight.
AW109SP "Da Vinci"Customised version of the AW109SP for REGA (Swiss Air Rescue), with fixed landing gear.
AW109 TrekkerAW109S Grand airframe with fixed landing skids, equipped with a Genesys Aerosystems glass cockpit.

Specifications (A109S Grand with PW207)

See also

References

External links

 GrandNew page on Leonardocompany.com

AW109
Agusta aircraft
Search and rescue helicopters
1980s Italian helicopters
Italian civil utility aircraft
Italian military utility aircraft
Twin-turbine helicopters
Aircraft first flown in 1988